Narke (from ancient Greek ναρκῶ narkō, "to make numb") is a genus of electric rays in the family Narkidae, found in the western Indo-Pacific and off southern Africa. They have nearly circular pectoral fin discs and short, thick tails with large caudal fins, and can be identified by their single dorsal fin (a trait shared only by Typhlonarke within the family). There are three described species, as well as a fourth undescribed dwarf species from Taiwan.

Species
 Narke capensis J. F. Gmelin, 1789 (Onefin electric ray)
 Narke dipterygia Bloch & Schneider, 1801 (Numbray)
 Narke japonica Temminck & Schlegel, 1850 (Japanese sleeper ray)

References

Narkidae
Ray genera
Taxa named by Johann Jakob Kaup
Strongly electric fish